Broadway station is a Caltrain station in Burlingame, California. Caltrain only serves the stop on weekends and holidays; weekday service is provided by a bus shuttle to nearby Millbrae station.

History

A station in north Burlingame was opened around 1911, and renamed to Buri Buri in 1917, then Broadway in 1926. The former Southern Pacific Railroad depot building at Broadway still stands and used as a restaurant. A lightly-used station at nearby Easton (which existed as a separate town from 1906 to 1910) was in service until at least 1925. The San Francisco Municipal Railway 40 San Mateo interurban, originally operated by United Railroads of San Francisco, served passengers at the station from their line on what became California Drive until the service ceased in 1949.

Like most stations on the corridor, the Southern Pacific built Broadway with a side platform on the west track for southbound trains, and a narrow island platform between the tracks for northbound trains. Because of the narrow center platform for northbound passengers, a hold-out rule is in effect at the station: if a train is stopped for passengers, an approaching train in the opposite direction on the other track must wait outside the station. The resulting delays were the main reason that Broadway became a weekend-only station on August 1, 2005, shortly after the Caltrain Express project was completed. A free shuttle to Millbrae station was implemented in lieu of weekday service.

Future plans
After the electrification of Caltrain is completed, daily service is planned to be reinstated at Broadway.

The nearby level grade crossing at Broadway Avenue is planned to be grade-separated, with construction projected to start as early as 2025 if funding can be identified. The at-grade crossing has been identified as the second-most necessary grade separation among 10,000 at-grade crossings in California because it handles 70,000 vehicles per day, and city officials state it is the site of the worst traffic congestion in Burlingame. Grade separation is projected to cost $250 million. Plans for a grade separation started in 1965 when the Peninsula Commute was being operated by the Southern Pacific Railroad, but were stymied by the complex geometry of Broadway, which intersects with roads immediately east (Carolan) and west (California) of the level crossing, and (further east) passes over U.S. 101 at an interchange rebuilt in 2017, and the heavy rail traffic, projected at more than 114 trains per day by 2020. Traffic through the actual grade crossing was estimated at 27,000 vehicles per day in 2015. There are an average of two accidents and 105 traffic citations issued each year resulting from traffic stopped on the tracks.

Under Alternative A, shoofly tracks would first be constructed east of the existing line and west of Carolan, then rail traffic would be diverted while the existing line was elevated. After the new rail bridge and embankments were completed, rail traffic would shift back to the newly elevated original alignment and Broadway would be temporarily closed while being reconstructed at a depressed alignment. Alternatives with the rail line lowered were considered, but they were rejected because of the high cost of drainage due to three nearby creeks. Broadway station would be rebuilt with an island platform to remove the existing hold-out rule. A preliminary design for the grade separation and station rebuild was anticipated for Spring 2019, and ultimately completed in October 2020 along with environmental clearance. The project is forecast to finish construction by summer of 2027.

References

External links

Caltrain - Broadway
Broadway Grade Separation (City of Burlingame)
Burlingame Broadway Grade Separation Project (Caltrain)

Caltrain stations in San Mateo County, California
Burlingame, California
Former Southern Pacific Railroad stations in California